Michal Peprník is a professor at Palacký University, Olomouc, Czech Republic. He is the Head of the Literature Section, and the Secretary of The Czech and Slovak Association for American Studies. He is also the chief coordinator of the international Olomouc Colloquium of American Studies.
He taught Czech literature courses at the Department of Slavonic Languages & Literatures at the University of Glasgow in 1992-1993 and habilitated in 2003.
His main fields of research include American Romanticism, concepts of space (topos) and metamorphosis (transformation), the myths of the West, and the literature of the Fantastic.

Monographs, Books 
 Dětský hrdina v díle J. D. Salingera (1984)
 Motiv metamorfózy v díle Jamese Hogga, R. L. Stevensona a George MacDonalda (1995)
 Směry literární interpretace XX.století/texty, komentáře (2000, 2005)
 Metamorfóza jako kulturní metafora [Metamorphosis as a Cultural Metaphor] (2004)
 Topos lesa v americké literatuře (2005)

Essays and other academic papers 
 Literature as a Political Tool? (2003)
 The Place of the Other: the Dark Forest (2003)
 Fenomén Bercovitch aneb jak dobý(í)t Ameriku (2003)
 Democratic Ideals in American Popular Culture and Literature (2004)
 Podstatný hybrid (2004)
 Z Krvavé komnaty k Černé Venuši (review, 2004)
 Moravian Origins of J.F. Cooper's Indians (2004)
 Cooper's Indians: Typology and Function (2005)
 Cesta amerického románu k romantickým asociacím a mýtu (2007)
 Henry James jako literární kritik (2008)

External links and sources 
 Department of English and American Studies
 American Studies Colloquium
 Czech and Slovak Association for American Studies
 Lecturer Profile
 Peprník, Michal. Topos lesa v americké literatuře. Brno: Host. 2005 

1960 births
Living people
Czech male writers
Academic staff of Palacký University Olomouc